The Mid-American Conference women's basketball tournament is the postseason single-elimination tournament for the NCAA Division I Mid-American Conference (MAC). The winner of the tournament receives the MAC's automatic bid to the NCAA Division I women's basketball tournament.  As of the next MAC tournament in 2021, the top eight teams in conference play will qualify for the tournament.

Format
On May 12, 2020, the MAC announced a series of changes to its competitive format in multiple sports in response to fallout from the COVID-19 pandemic; these changes took effect in the 2020–21 school year and will remain in place through at least 2023–24. With respect to men's and women's basketball, the MAC abandoned its divisional format for a single league table, increased the conference schedule from 18 to 20 games, and reduced the conference tournament field to 8. All qualifying teams will continue to play at Rocket Mortgage FieldHouse in Cleveland, and the men's and women's tournaments will continue to run concurrently.

Through the 2020 edition, canceled in progress due to COVID-19, the tournament involved all 12 conference members. In 2019 and 2020, the top four seeds received byes into the quarterfinals; all other teams started play in the first round at campus sites. The survivors of these games joined the top four seeds in Cleveland for the remainder of the tournament. This structure was used in the MAC men's tournament from 2016 to 2020.

From 2012 to 2018, the No. 1 and 2 seeds earned a "double-bye" to the semifinals, with the No. 3 and 4 seeds beginning tournament play in the quarterfinals. Teams seeded 5–12 had to play an additional two rounds, beginning with campus-site games in the first round. All other games were at the venue now known as Rocket Mortgage FieldHouse, which has served as the regular host for the men's tournament since 2000. When the MAC adopted this format, it abandoned a former practice of awarding the top two seeds to its divisional winners. Teams were (and still are) seeded based on conference record, regardless of their place in their division — though no division champion was seeded lower than fourth.

In the previous tournament format, teams were seeded per division by conference record using a series of specified tiebreakers when necessary. The top two seeds in each division received byes into the quarterfinals.

Yearly results

Performance by school

See also
 Mid-American Conference men's basketball tournament

References